Juan Sebastián Elcano ( 1486–1526) was a Spanish explorer of Basque origin and first man to circumnavigate the earth.

Elcano may also refer to:

 Spanish training ship Juan Sebastián de Elcano, flagship Spanish vessel
 USS Elcano (PG-38), a gunboat seized by the US Navy from the Spanish in 1898
 Elcano (or Elkano), a hamlet of Aia, Basque Country, Spain
 Elcano, Navarre (Elkano in Basque), a village in Valle de Egüés, Navarre, Spain

See also
 
 El Caño, Natá District, Coclé Province, Panama
 El Caño, Panama (archaeological site)